Marbin (also Romanized as Mārbīn) is a village in Barzavand Rural District, in the Central District of Ardestan County, Isfahan Province, Iran. At the 2006 census, its population was 206, in 72 families.

References 

Populated places in Ardestan County